Grande Colline National Park (French: Parc National Naturel de Grande Colline) is a national park in Haiti established on July 23, 2014 with an area of 1,510 hectares. The park contains the Grande Colline mountain range (Chaîne de la Grande Colline) at the core of the Occidental La Hotte Massif (Massif de la Hotte) in southwestern Haiti, west of Pic Macaya. There are five named peaks: Morne Desbarrières (1843 m), Morne Grande Colline (2025 m), Morne Petite Colline (1860 m), Morne Grenouille (2006 m), and Morne Lézard (1854 m).

This park is one of the most remote and difficult to reach areas in Haiti. It was explored by the founders of the Haiti National Trust in 2011–2015, with assistance of a helicopter and supported by the National Science Foundation and Critical Ecosystem Partnership Fund. The new species discovered and resulting information on the ecosystem and threats led to the creation of the national park in 2014. Isolated stands of original forest containing giant tree ferns and hardwoods remain at elevations above 1800 meters, but deforestation continues in the park, for building materials, agriculture, and charcoal production.

See also 
 List of national parks of Haiti
 Haiti National Trust

References

National parks of Haiti